Thein Swe is a Burmese politician and political prisoner who currently serves as an Amyotha Hluttaw member of parliament for Ayeyarwady Region' Constituency № 10 (Dedaye and Pyapon Townships). His father Min Swe is a former MP elect, having won a majority of 20,358 (64% of the votes) in the 1990 Burmese general election.

Political career
He is a member of the National League for Democracy, he was elected as an Amyotha Hluttaw MP and elected representative from Ayeyarwady Region' Constituency № 10 (Dedaye and Pyapon Townships).

References

Members of the House of Nationalities
National League for Democracy politicians
Prisoners and detainees of Myanmar
Living people
1967 births
People from Ayeyarwady Region